Streif is a World Cup downhill ski course in Austria, located on Hahnenkamm mountain (Kitzbühel Alps) in Kitzbühel, Tyrol, competing for the Hahnenkamm Races since 1937.

It runs on natural terrain (pasture in summer) with minor modifications done over the years, next to the "Ganslern" course.

With 50,000 people attending, the Streif is the most visited ski event each year, with many famous people having attended, including Arnold Schwarzenegger.

It is the most famous, the most prestigious and the most watched ski competition, with a global audience of about 300 milion people annually.

History 
From 1931 until 1936 it was held on the nearby courses "Hahnenkamm" and "Ehrenbachhöhe". Since its inception in 1937, the Hahnenkamm slalom is held on this course (Ganslern).

In 1954, one time exceptionally no Hahnenkamm Trophy was awarded, they were competing on the so-called "Vorderganslern" at Austrian International Winter Sports III competition.

In 2006, morning fog at the top forced organizers to lower the start  to the middle of the "Karusell", below the "Mausefalle".  This shortened the length of the course by 347 m.

The downhill races were cancelled in seasons 1964, 1970, 1971, 1988 1988, 1993 2005 and 2007 due to weather conditions, mostly due to lack of snow and were replaced on other venues.

In 2008, strong upwinds at the "Mausefalle" caused race officials to lower the start 50 m, shortening the course by 100 m. This eliminated most of the "Startschuss" and its instantaneous speed; the "Mausefalle" was accordingly altered to a speed-inducing pitch, rather than a formidable jump and compression. Though Didier Cuche won the race, the 2008 edition is likely best remembered for the high-speed crash of Scott Macartney on the "Zielsprung", seconds before the finish, as well as Bode Miller tying for second with Mario Scheiber after riding the safety fencing in the "Steilhang" exit to "Brückenschuss" section.

The full course returned in 2009, for the first time in five years, with Didier Défago winning the race. It was the second consecutive downhill victory for Défago; he won the Lauberhorn downhill the previous week at Wengen to join a handful of skiers to win both classic races in consecutive weeks. It was last accomplished by Stephan Eberharter in 2002 and first Swiss win since 1992 win by Franz Heinzer. The final training run on Thursday saw the serious crash of Swiss racer Daniel Albrecht, again at the "Zielsprung." It resulted in a three-week coma and Albrecht's absence from the World Cup circuit for the remainder of the 2009 season and the entire 2010 season.

The full course was run in 2010 under clear skies and again won by Didier Cuche, who had also won the Super-G the previous day. The only significant crash was by former champion Michael Walchhofer, who twisted into the net fence at the final left turn, less than 20 seconds from the finish; he was quickly back on his feet. Cuche's downhill victory was his third on the "Streif", his first was in 1998 on a Friday "extra" race. The "Zielsprung" was significantly moderated in 2010 due to the serious accidents the previous two years.

In 2011, Didier Cuche won the Hahnenkamm downhill for the fourth time to tie the record with Franz Klammer.

A year later, and two days after announcing his retirement at the end of the season, Cuche claimed his third consecutive downhill victory at Kitzbühel and a record fifth in total.

in 2013, Dominik Paris claimed the title to become the second winner from Italy and the first in fifteen years after Kristian Ghedina.

in 2014, the lower course was altered due to lack of snow. The dramatic "Querfahrt" sidehill traverse and speed-inducing "Zielschuss" were bypassed; the racers detoured toward the "Ganslern" slalom course, then rejoined the course for the final "Rasmusleitn". Hannes Reichelt was the first winner from Austria in eight years.

In 2015, upper mountain fog forced the start to the "Seidlalmsprung" section, the lowest in history. Kjetil Jansrud of Norway won in less than a minute on the lower 50% of the course.

High winds in 2016 lowered the start 40 m to the top of Mausefalle. On the full course in 2017, Paris became a two-time winner.

In 2023, Lindsey Vonn became the first woman to ski the Streif, although on her own and not competitively.

Course sections 
Sections of the Streif downhill course include:

Startschuss 
At  (AA) start house straight down to 160 metres long "Startschuss" (Starthang) with 27° degrees (51%) incline, reaching 100 km/h in 8.5 seconds on the extreme icy and leaning surface direct to "Mausefalle" jump. Skier has no time to breathe. There is a very special atmosphere in the start, with total silence, skiers have total respect for this dangerous course.

Mausefalle 
"Mausefalle" (mousetrap) is the most famous and the steepest part of the course with 40.4° degrees (85%) incline. Skier overjumps this incredibly steep hang about 80 meters long at about 100 km/h and increase up to 120 km/h at the bottom of this section. Around 1955, this section was named by the father of Austrian ski legend Toni Sailer, who compared this jump to a mouse trap as skiers jump to the unknown, into the abyss.

Karusell 
"Karusell" (carousel) is a very demanding at high speed entering 180-degree leaning turn. Here athletes endure centrifugal force of 3.1 g.

Steilhang 
"Steilhang" (steep slope) is one of the most technically challenging sections in the World Cup with demanding and extended technical right turn with 35.8° degrees (72%) incline and entrance to the flats at the end.

Brückenschuss & Gschöss 
"Brückenschuss & Gschöss" are the easiest part of the course, gliding flats road, time to take a little breath, but need to focusing on not to lose and maintain good speed

Alte Schneise 
"Alte Schneise" (old corridor) is the steep long section, not extremely demanding. Section starts after small jump, right after gliding flats road

Seidlalmsprung 
"Seidlalmsprung" (Seidlalm jump) was first introduced in 1994. It is located next to Seidlalm farm, where World Cup was founded by Serge Lang, Honore Bonnet and Bob Beattie in 1966. It is exactly on midpoint of the course. Athletes approach the jump in a deep squat position, without being able to see what is coming next. This is no time to be making any mistakes!Whilst in the air they must rotate to the right in order to be correctly positioned for the sweeping curve of the "Seidlalmkurve".

Lärchenschuss 
"Lärchenschuss" is a gliding among larch trees section, reached right after 90° degrees turn, leading into "Oberhausberg" section

Hausbergkante 
"Hausbergkante" (Hausberg fall) hang is the key and deciding part of the course, jumping over 35° degrees (70%) incline gradient into extremely demanding left turn into a compression.

It is followed by a challenging sharp left left turn to the "Hausberg Querfahrt" into "Traverse", where the most falls, some of them very spectacular happened over the years.

Traverse 
"Traverse" or "Querfahrt", is a rough sidehill of glare ice, strong leaning bumpy terrain, defying gravity, with many spectacular falls in the past.

Zielschuss 
"Zielschuss" (Finish speed ride) with compression & jump and with top speed over  leading into a finish jump.

Rasmusleitn 
"Rasmusleitn" or "Zielsprung" is a spectacular, long and very tricky jump just before the finish line at high speed, on which many suffered severe injuries with brutal falls.

Facts and figures 

 The average grade of the course is 27 percent (15.1 degrees).
 The maximum grade is 85% (40.4°) at the Mausefalle; minimum is 2% (1.1°) 
 The first non-European to win a downhill race at Kitzbühel in the World Cup era was Ken Read of Canada in 1980. Previously, the only non-European champion was Buddy Werner of the U.S., who won in 1959 at age 22. Canadians won races four consecutive years from 1980–83; the only non-European winner since is Daron Rahlves of the U.S., who prevailed on an abbreviated course of  due to fog in 2003.
 Five victories have gone to Scandinavians, all from Norway. Atle Skårdal was the first in 1990 and Lasse Kjus won twice, in 1999 and 2004; both of Kjus' victories were "extra" races, held on Friday and Thursday, respectively. Kjetil Jansrud won on a shortened course in 2015. In 2022 Aleksander Aamodt Kilde became the fourth Norwegian to win this race. 
 The Streif course was one of several featured in the 1969 movie Downhill Racer, starring Robert Redford and Gene Hackman. It was shown as itself and later as the Olympic course, with race footage from the 1969 race.
 The Streif course was first used in 1937; eight years without Hahnenkamm races followed (1938–45) until the return in 1946.
 Since returning in 1946, the downhill races have been run in all but eight years: 1952, 1964, 1970, 1971, 1988, 1993, 2005, & 2007.

Downhill champions
The following is a list of Hahnenkamm downhill winners, with their winning times:

Each downhill champion's name is affixed to a gondola car on the Hahnenkammbahn lift, which extends from the Kitzbühel base to the top of the Hahnenkamm mountain.

Club5+ 
In 1986, elite Club5 was originally founded by prestigious classic downhill organizers: Kitzbühel, Wengen, Garmisch, Val d’Isère and Val Gardena/Gröden, with goal to bring alpine ski sport on the highest levels possible.

Later over the years other classic longterm organizers joined the now named Club5+: Alta Badia, Cortina, Kranjska Gora, Maribor, Lake Louise, Schladming, Adelboden, Kvitfjell, St.Moritz and Åre.

References

Alpine skiing in Austria
Skiing in Austria
Kitzbühel